Matthew Wall (born 5 March 1960) is  a former Australian rules footballer who played with Richmond in the Victorian Football League (VFL). 		
		
Days before his VFL debut in the opening round of the 1980 VFL season, Wall rolled his car, causing it to be a write-off, however was unhurt.

Notes

External links 		
		
		
		
		
		
		
Living people		
1960 births			
Australian rules footballers from Victoria (Australia)		
Richmond Football Club players